The Nahar Singh Stadium previously known as Mayur Stadium is a cricket stadium in the Indian city of Faridabad.

The last official match played here was an ODI between India and England on 31 March 2006.

In 2017, stadium hosted a match between Indian Blind cricket team and the West Indies blind cricket team as a part of 2017 Blind T20 World Cup in which the Indian team won by a great margin.

In 2019, renovations started to make the stadium fit for international matches and is expected to be completed by 2022.

The ground has seen cavalier innings by Douglas Marillier with sweep shots above the keeper's head to deny India a victory, or most recently, a hard-fought steady knock from Suresh Raina to snatch victory away

Stadium is named after Indian Rebellion of 1857 Nahar Singh. As of 11 September 2018, it has hosted 8 ODIs.

History
Nahar Singh cricket stadium was built in 1981. On 14 September 1986 the then Chief Minister of Haryana Bhajan Lal sanctioned for the renovation of the stadium immediately.

The first match, a Ranji Trophy game between Haryana and Services was played on 22 November 1982.

In January 1987, a match between Pakistan under-25 versus Indian Board President's XI was played in this stadium.

The first one-day international match was played between India and West Indies. The Indian team was led by Ravi Shastri and the West Indian side by Vivian Richards. West Indies won the match by 4 wickets even though India's Mohinder Amarnath scored an unbeaten century (100*).

In November 1988, a match between New Zealand versus North Zone. This game was a benefit match for Haryana player Sarkar Talwar and spinner Rajinder Goel. Later, three one day international matches were played.

The venue hosted first of three ODIs between India and Zimbabwe for the Charms Cup 1992/93.

In 1994, the venue hosted first of 5 ODIs between India and West Indies. Significantly, this match was the last ODI for all rounder Kapil Dev.

In 1996, this ground hosted a game between Australia and South Africa in the Titan Cup series.

In 2003, New Zealand were dismissed for 97 against Australia in the TVS Cup is the lowest ODI score at this venue.

The venue has also hosted the match between Ranji Winners Delhi and England. This apart, around 50 matches which includes Ranji Trophy, Duleep Trophy, Deodhar Trophy and Wills Trophy have been played here.

In October 1992, a match between Rest of India versus Haryana was played and Haryana team led by Kapil Dev defeated Rest of India. The coach of the Haryana side was Sarkar Talwar.

The ground has a capacity of to hold around 25,000 people. There are six center pitches and three practice pitches. There is also a modern pavilion with a suite which can has 200 seats. It also has a commentator box, box for media, press box, President box, Umpire room, health club, restaurant, billiards room, card room, and coffee shop. There is an outdoor tennis court. On the north side 9 stands have been constructed with an office and parking facility for ministers.

In 2007, Haryana Cricket Association took decision to take an international match out of Nahar Singh Stadium to Chandigarh's Sector 16 Stadium.

As of 11 Sept, 2018 it has hosted 8 ODIs.

One Day International cricket

The stadium has hosted following ODI matches till date.

References

External links
Cricinfo profile – Ground Page
cricketarchive profile – Ground Page

Cricket grounds in Haryana
Faridabad
Sports venues completed in 1981
1981 establishments in Haryana